Nebraska Central College was a college located in Central City, Nebraska. It opened in 1885 as a Methodist college. It closed in 1891 before being reopened in 1899 by Quakers. It ceased operations for good in the fall of 1952.

References

Defunct private universities and colleges in Nebraska
Educational institutions established in 1885
Educational institutions disestablished in 1952
1885 establishments in Nebraska
1952 disestablishments in Nebraska